The Ždrelac Bridge is a  through arch bridge carrying the D110 state road connecting islands of Ugljan and Pašman in Croatia. The original bridge was completed in 1972, however 2009 reconstruction increased the main span (replacing three spans with one) and widened the deck.

The reconstruction works also included strengthening the piers supporting the central span arch structure. Cost of the reconstruction works was reported to be 17.17 million Croatian kuna. The reconstruction works were carried out by Konstruktor, Split.

Traffic volume
Traffic on the state roads in Croatia is regularly counted and reported by Hrvatske ceste, operator of the state roads. There is no actual traffic count performed at the Ždrilac Bridge itself, however Hrvatske ceste operate a counting station which covers a section of the D110 state road adjacent to the D8 and L63171 county road junction (to the east of the junction). Since the Ždrilac Bridge is located immediately to the west of the junction, and no other D8 junctions are found between the two, the figure, even though not exact, is highly indicative of the traffic volume carried by the bridge.

See also
 D110 state road

References

Cross-sea bridges in Croatia
Bridges completed in 1972
Through arch bridges
Buildings and structures in Zadar County
Transport in Zadar County